Elamaram is a village in the Indian state of Kerala.  It is situated near Edavannappara in Malappuram District of Kerala.  This village is very scenic as it is on the bank of Chaliyar.   There is a ferry service here that can take you to the northern side of the Chaliyar river. The ticket is Rs.5.00 and the motor boat service is available every half an hour between 6.40 a.m. and 8.40 p.m. including Sundays.

Ghost Town

Across the river Chaliyar lies the abandoned Industries factory named "'Gwalior Rayons'" (later renamed as Grasim) which once employed 2,000 employees.  Environmental agitations in 1998 under the leadership of K. A. Rahman caused the closure of the factory and the entire village went bankrupt because of the sudden development and eleven people even committed suicide because of not being able to face unexpected poverty.

The resort Chaliyar Jalak looks like an abandoned place like the Grasim Factory nearby. Even though there are many rooms and a river side picnic space with tiled footpaths, there is no maintenance of any sort.  The place looks eerie with no staff, not even a watchman to take care of the property.

Shopping
In the nearby town of Edavannappara,  the shopping facilities available are quite surprisingly elaborate. The MC Mall in the heart of the town looks like an upmarket city facility. There are also many theme restaurants here. It appears that the villagers here have a flair for good living.

Pilgrimage

The Konnara Dargah is three kilometres away from elamaram on the bank of the Chaliyar river.  It is the holy resting place of a Muslim saint where hundreds of pilgrims visit regularly.

Nearby villages
Edavannappara,
Pancheeri,
Palakkd,
Mapram,
Konnar,
Vettathur, 
Cheruvadikavu, Kottupadam, Kakkov, Channayil Palliyali, Akode, Virippad, Oorkkadavu, Korappadam, Mundumuzhi, Vazhakkad, Valillappuzha, Vazhakkad, Kondotty, Neerad, Muthuvalloor, Moochikal, Mundakkulam, Muthuparamba Road, Vettukad, Omanoor, Ponnad, Iruppanthody Karatt Chola Kolambalam

Transportation
Elamaram village connects to other parts of India through Kondotty town on the west and Nilambur town on the east.  National highway No.66 passes through Kondotty and the northern stretch connects to Goa and Mumbai.  The southern stretch connects to Cochin and Trivandrum.  State Highway No.28 starts from Nilambur and connects to Ooty, Mysore and Bangalore through Highways.12,29 and 181. The nearest airport is at Kozhikode.  The nearest major railway station is at Feroke.

See also

 Elamaram Kareem
  Vazhakkad
 Edavannappara

References

External links

Villages in Malappuram district
Kondotty area